Achatia is a moth genus in the family Noctuidae.

Species

 Achatia confusa Hübner, 1827
 Achatia demissa Walker, 1857
 Achatia distincta Hübner, [1813] – distinct Quaker moth
 Achatia dogmatica Dyar
 Achatia evicta Grote, 1873
 Achatia funebris Köhler, 1947
 Achatia infidelis Grote, 1879
 Achatia infructuosa Walker, 1857
 Achatia latex Guenée, 1852
 Achatia mucens Hübner, 1827
 Achatia multifaria Walker, 1857
 Achatia rileyana Smith, 1890
 Achatia sectilana Strand, 1917
 Achatia sectilis Guenée, 1852
 Achatia spoliata Walker, 1857
 Achatia vitis French, 1879
 Achatia vomerina Grote, 1873

References
 Achatia at Markku Savela's Lepidoptera and some other life forms
 Natural History Museum Lepidoptera genus database

Orthosiini
Noctuoidea genera